National Heroes Acre may refer to:

 Heroes' Acre (Namibia)
 National Heroes Acre (Zimbabwe)
 Heroes' Acre (South Africa)